Ilya Dzhugir (born 11 February 1999) is a Belarusian professional footballer who plays for Zhodino-Yuzhnoye.

References

External links 
 
 
 Player's profile at Torpedo-BelAZ Zhodino website 

1999 births
Living people
People from Zhodzina
Sportspeople from Minsk Region
Belarusian footballers
Association football defenders
FC Torpedo-BelAZ Zhodino players
FC Granit Mikashevichi players
FC Krumkachy Minsk players
FC Orsha players